LifeStyles Condoms is a brand of condoms made by the former Australian company Ansell Limited, previously known as Pacific Dunlop Limited. In 2017, Ansell sold their condom business to a Chinese consortium for over US$600 million. Lifestyles HealthCare and all other Ansell affiliated condom brands: Skyn (non-latex condom brand sold globally), Blowtex (sold in Brazil), LifeStyles (sold in Australia and in United States), Manix/Mates (sold in Europe: France, UK and others countries), Unimil (sold in Poland), Jissbon (sold in China).

In 2017, Ansell announced the sale of their sexual wellness business to Chinese companies Humanwell Healthcare and CITIC Capital; the acquisition was completed on the same year.

On November 9, 2020, Humanwell Healthcare, which held a 60% stake in the sexual division (the remaining 40% was held by CITIC Capital), announced the sale of a 40% stake for US$ 200 million to Chinese private equity firms Hillhouse Capital, Boyu Capital and CareCapital Partners, through the subsidiaries LFSY Holdings Limited, Autumn Appaloosa Limited and CareCapital Lifestyles Holdings, Ltd. After this announcement, the new ownership structure is 40% CITIC Capital, 20% Humanwell Healthcare, 18% Hillhouse Capital, 16% Boyu Capital and 6% CareCapital Partners.

On July 23, 2021, Bloomberg News reported that the owners of Lifestyles Healthcare, led by majority shareholder CITIC Capital, are considering selling the condom and lubricant maker's operations outside of China for about US$500 million. Therefore, current shareholders intend to keep the condom maker's business in China after the divestment.

On September 29, 2022, the Australian newspaper Australian Financial Review reported that the owners of Lifestyles Healthcare, led by majority shareholder CITIC Capital, are in final talks with an US-based Private Equity firm for the sale of the global operation (excluding the Chinese market) for a value of more than US$500 million.

On December 1, 2022, Linden Capital Partners, a Chicago-based private equity firm focused exclusively on the healthcare industry, announced the acquisition of LifeStyles Healthcare. As part of the transaction, the Chinese operations of LifeStyles, including the Jissbon brand, will be separated from the parent company and be retained by the selling shareholders.

Advertising and marketing
In 1987, in their advert a woman says: "I'll do a lot for love, but I'm not ready to die for it", to directly confront the AIDS epidemic.

In 1996, the company began advertising on television in the United States, where broadcasters had previously been unwilling to air the commercials.

Product line
LifeStyles Skyn Condoms
LifeStyles X2 Lubricated Condoms
LifeStyles Ultra Thin Condoms
LifeStyles Ultra Sensitive Condoms
LifeStyles Ultra Sensitive Lubricated Condoms
LifeStyles Ultra Lube Plus Condoms
LifeStyles Ultra Lubricated Condoms
LifeStyles Pleasure Tripped Condoms
LifeStyles Ribbed Pleasure Condoms
LifeStyles Sheer Pleasure Condoms
LifeStyles Warming Pleasure Condoms
LifeStyles His n' Her Pleasure Condoms
LifeStyles Triple Pleasure 3-in-1 Condoms
LifeStyles MEGA Condoms
LifeStyles Studded Condoms
LifeStyles Flavors/Colors Condoms
LifeStyles Snugger Fit Condoms
LifeStyles Condom Discs
LifeStyles Classic Collection of Condoms
LifeStyles Condom Pleasure Pack
LifeStyles Premier Collection Lubricated Condoms
LifeStyles Sensual Kit
LifeStyles Ultra Ribbed Condom N' Ring Kit

References

External links
 LifeStyles official site
 Humanwell official site

Condom brands